Gol Qabagh (also Romanized as Gol Qabāgh, Gol Qobāgh, and Gol-e Qabāgh; also known as Gol-e Khāvak and Gul-i-Khāwak) is a village in Howmeh Rural District, in the Central District of Divandarreh County, Kurdistan Province, Iran. At the 2006 census, its population was 95, in 23 families. The village is populated by Kurds.

References 

Towns and villages in Divandarreh County
Kurdish settlements in Kurdistan Province